Talence is a commune in the Gironde department, administrative region of Nouvelle-Aquitaine, France.

It is the third-largest suburb of the city of Bordeaux, and is adjacent to it on the south side. It is a member of the Bordeaux Métropole.

Talence is the home of Décastar, a prestigious yearly international decathlon event.

In Talence, there are different universities: Bordeaux University, Architecture School of Bordeaux and KEDGE Business School.

Population

Geography 

Talence is situated with Bordeaux to the North, Bègles to the East, Villenave-d'Ornon to the South-East, Gradignan to the South-West, and Pessac to the West.

Climate

Sights
 Jardin botanique de Talence

Personalities
 Romain Brégerie, footballer
 Mireille Bousquet-Mélou, mathematician
 José Bové, radical activist
 Jérôme Cahuzac, politician
 Jules Carvallo, engineer
 Gérald Cid, footballer
 Émile Durkheim, sociologist, lived from 1887 to 1897 in Talence
 Henrik, Prince Consort of Denmark
 Florian Marange, professional footballer. He plays for the left side defender at SC Bastia
 Thierry Meyssan, writer
 Ed Tourriol, cartoonist

International relations

Talence is twinned with:
 Trikala, Greece
 Alcalá de Henares, Spain
 Chaves, Portugal

See also
Communes of the Gironde department

References

External links

 Official website 

Communes of Gironde